Tlacuilolxochtzin (Nahuatl: tɬakʷilolʃotʃtsin) was an Aztec noblewoman of very noble heritage, Lady of Ecatepec and sister of queen Tlapalizquixochtzin.

Family 
She was a Princess - the daughter of Tlatoani Matlaccoatzin and thus granddaughter of the Tlatoani Chimalpilli I.

Tlacuilolxochtzin was a relative to several Aztec Emperors and she married Prince Tezozomoctli Acolnahuacatl of Tenochtitlan.

Their sons were Tlatoani Diego de Alvarado Huanitzin (the first governor of Tenochtitlan), and one lord who went to Spain.

Notes

Aztec nobility
Nahua nobility
Cihuatlatoque
Tlatoque of Ecatepec
15th-century indigenous people of the Americas
15th-century women rulers
Indigenous Mexican women
Nobility of the Americas